The Journal of Physical Chemistry C publishes scientific articles reporting research on several subdisciplines of physical chemistry:

Nanoparticles and nanostructures
surfaces, interfaces, and catalysis
Electron transport, optical and electronic devices
Energy conversion and storage

It was created in 2007 when The Journal of Physical Chemistry B was split in two, largely due to the recent growth in the area of nanotechnology.  The journal is published weekly, with the first issue on January 11, 2007.  Like The Journal of Physical Chemistry A and B, it is published by the American Chemical Society.

The journal is indexed in: Chemical Abstracts Service (CAS) and British Library. According to the Journal Citation Reports, the journal had a 2021 impact factor of 4.177.

Editor-in-Chief

2007–2019 George C. Schatz
2020–present Joan-Emma Shea

See also 
 The Journal of Physical Chemistry A
 The Journal of Physical Chemistry B
 The Journal of Physical Chemistry Letters
 Russian Journal of Physical Chemistry A
 Russian Journal of Physical Chemistry B
 Annual Review of Physical Chemistry

External links

References

Physical chemistry journals
American Chemical Society academic journals
Weekly journals
Publications established in 2007
English-language journals
Nanotechnology journals